Cereopsius nigrofasciatus is a species of beetle in the family Cerambycidae. It was described by Per Olof Christopher Aurivillius in 1913. It is known from Borneo.

References

Cereopsius
Beetles described in 1913